Ministry of Health may refer to:

Note: Italics indicate now-defunct ministries.

 Ministry of Health (Argentina)
 Ministry of Health (Armenia)
 Australia:
 Ministry of Health (New South Wales)
 Ministry of Health (The Bahamas)
 Ministry of Health (Bahrain)
 Ministry of Health (Bhutan)
 Ministry of Health (Brazil)
 Ministry of Health (Brunei)
 Ministry of Health (Cambodia)
 Canada:
 Ministry of Health (Alberta)
 Ministry of Health (British Columbia)
 Ministry of Health (Ontario)
 Ministry of Health (Saskatchewan)
 Ministry of Health (Chile)
 Ministry of Health of the People's Republic of China
 Ministry of Health (Croatia)
 Ministry of Health (Czech Republic)
 Ministry of Health (Denmark)
 Ministry of Health (East Timor)
 Ministry of Health (Ethiopia)
 Ministry of Health (Ghana)
 Ministry of Health (Greece)
 Ministry of Health (Guinea)
 Ministry of Health (Haiti)
 Ministry of Health (Indonesia)
 Ministry of Health (Pasundan)
 Ministry of Health (Iraq)
 Ministry of Health (Israel)
 Ministry of Health (Italy)
 Ministry of Health (Kenya)
 Ministry of Health (Kuwait)
 Ministry of Health (Laos)
 Ministry of Health (Lithuania)
 Ministry of Health (Malaysia)
 Ministry of Health (Moldova)
 Ministry of Health (Montenegro)
 Ministry of Health (Morocco)
 Ministry of Health (Myanmar)
 Ministry of Health (New Zealand)
 Nigeria:
 Akwa Ibom State Ministry of Health
 Lagos State Ministry of Health
 Rivers State Ministry of Health
 Ministry of Health, Palestine
 Ministry of Health (Panama)
 Ministry of Health (Peru)
 Ministry of Health (Bangsamoro), Philippines
 Ministry of Health (Poland)
 Ministry of Health (Portugal)
 Ministry of Health (Rhodesia)
 Ministry of Health (Romania)
 Ministry of Health (Russia)
 Ministry of Health (Bashkortostan)
 Ministry of Health (Rwanda)
 Ministry of Health (Saudi Arabia)
 Ministry of Health (Serbia)
 Ministry of Health (Singapore)
 Ministry of Health (Somalia)
 Ministry of Health (Somaliland)
 Ministry of Health (South Sudan)
 Ministry of Health (Soviet Union)
 Ministry of Health (Spain)
 Ministry of Health (Sri Lanka)
 Ministry of Health (Syria)
 Ministry of Health (Tajikistan)
 Ministry of Health (Turkey)
 Ministry of Health (Turkmenistan)
 Ministry of Health (Uganda)
 Ministry of Health (United Arab Emirates)
 Ministry of Health (Vietnam)
 Ministry of Health (Zambia)

See also
 List of health departments and ministries
 Federal Ministry of Health (Germany)
 Federal Ministry of Health (Nigeria)
 Ministry of Public Health (disambiguation)